Mahmudoba is a village in the Khachmaz District of Azerbaijan.

References 

Populated places in Khachmaz District